Prayanam may refer to
 Prayanam (1975 film), a Malayalam film written by Padmarajan and directed by Bharathan
 Prayanam (2009 film), a Telugu film directed by Chandra Sekhar Yeleti